The 2017–18 Mohun Bagan A.C. season is the 128th season of Mohun Bagan A.C. since the club's formation in 1889 and their 11th season in the I-League which is India's top football league. They finished 2nd in the table in the Calcutta Football League and finished 3rd in the I-League.

Sanjoy Sen resigned as the coach of Mohun Bagan on 2 January 2018 following three home draws and a defeat against Chennai City placing the team in 4th position, virtually ending their title hopes. Shankarlal Chakraborthy was appointed as head coach for the remainder of the season.

Their title hopes however did stay intact till the last fixture of the season where they could have won the title had other results gone in their favour, but it was not to be and Minerva Punjab ultimately clinched the title. Although the 2017–18 season was not an ideal season for the club after a loss of form and change of coach midway through the season along with injuries to important players like Sony Norde and Yuta Kinowaki, they did manage to win both the home and away fixtures against arch rivals East Bengal.

Sponsor
As of 3 December 2017

Players

Current squad

Competitions

Calcutta Football League

I-League

Table

Results by round

Fixtures & results

Super Cup

Round of 16

Quarter final

Semi final

Player statistics

Goal scorers

Technical staff
{| class="wikitable"
|-
! Position
! Name
|-
| Chief coach
| Sankarlal Chakraborty
|-
| Assistant coach
|
|-
| Goalkeeping coach
| Arpan Dey
|-
| Physical Trainer
| Samiran Bag
|-
| Physiotherapist
| Abhinandan Chatterjee
|-
| Club Doctor
| Dr. Protim Roy
|-
| Team Manager
| Satyajit Chatterjee

Awards

Player

References

Mohun Bagan AC seasons
Mohun Bagan